RK Tacklers is a Danish rugby club in Odder.

External links
 RK Tacklers

Rugby clubs established in 2002
Danish rugby union teams
2002 establishments in Denmark